Group-based cryptography is a use of groups to construct cryptographic primitives.  A group is a very general algebraic object and most cryptographic schemes use groups in some way. In particular Diffie–Hellman key exchange uses finite cyclic groups.  So the term group-based cryptography refers mostly to cryptographic protocols that use infinite nonabelian groups such as a braid group.

Examples 
 Shpilrain–Zapata public-key protocols
 Magyarik–Wagner public key protocol
 Anshel–Anshel–Goldfeld key exchange
 Ko–Lee et al. key exchange protocol

See also 
Non-commutative cryptography

References

External links 
 Cryptography and Braid Groups page

Theory of cryptography
Braid groups